A sketchbook is a book or pad with blank pages for sketching.  It may also refer to:

 Sketchbook (manga), a Japanese manga series written and illustrated by Totan Kobako
 Sketchbook (software), a raster graphics software app intended for expressive drawing and concept sketching
 Sketchbook, an original 2022 documentary series made for the Disney+ service

Music
 Sketchbook (Fantasia album), the seventh studio album by American singer Fantasia
 Sketchbook, a 1990 album by American jazz bassist and composer John Patitucci
 Sketchbook, a 2002 album by American singer, songwriter and bassist Johnette Napolitano
 Sketchbook, a 2017 EP by South Korean boy band 100%